Count Antoni Jan Ostrowski (1782–1845) was a Polish noble (szlachcic), landowner, political and economic activist, general and publicist.

He became senator-castellan and member of the Sejm in the Kingdom of Poland (1815–1830). Founder of the city of Tomaszów Mazowiecki. During the November Uprising in 1830–1831, he was appointed general and commander of the National Guards (Gwardia Narodowa) in Warsaw. After the collapse of the Uprising he emigrated to France.

Works
 Pomysły o potrzebie reformy towarzyskiej... (1834)
 Pamiętnik z czasów powstania listopadowego (1961)

Useful bibliography 
 Ryszard Kotewicz, Antoni Ostrowski 1782-1845, ziemianin, przemysłowiec, założyciel Tomaszowa Mazowieckiego [Antoni Ostrowski 1782-1845, landowner, industrialist, founder of Tomaszów Mazowiecki], Warszawa 1995 (book in Polish; it includes photos, bibliography).
 W. Zajewski, Ostrowski Antoni Jan, in: Polski Słownik Biograficzny [Polish Biographical Dictionary], vol. XXIV, Wrocław 1979, pp. 546–550 (biographical note in Polish).

1782 births
1845 deaths
Nobility from Warsaw
People from Tomaszów Mazowiecki
Counts of Poland
Members of the Sejm of Duchy of Warsaw
Polish politicians
Polish publicists
Generals of the November Uprising
Recipients of the Order of Saint Stanislaus (Congress Poland)
Military personnel from Warsaw